The Madison Hotel Boardwalk Atlantic City is located in Atlantic City, New Jersey, United States. It was built in 1929 and added to the National Register of Historic Places on December 20, 1984.

The 14-story building opened as a luxury hotel at the beginning of the Great Depression in the United States. It went through bankruptcy in the 1960s and later became part of Sands Atlantic City.

In 2004, Sands invested $7 million to renovate and reconfigure the property into 126 suites. In 2006, both the Sands and the Madison Hotel were closed.

On May 25, 2013, the Madison Hotel was auctioned with a winning bid of $4 million by Eli Hadad, an owner of hotels in Florida and the Dominican Republic. However, the purchase was not completed and the property was again offered for sale. In November 2013, the hotel was purchased by Ratan Hotel Group for $2.5 million.

On January 25, 2014 it reopened as Baymont Inn & Suites Atlantic City Madison Hotel, managed by the Baymont Inn & Suites chain.

See also
National Register of Historic Places listings in Atlantic County, New Jersey
List of tallest buildings in Atlantic City

References

External links
Madison Hotel official website

Hotel buildings on the National Register of Historic Places in New Jersey
Colonial Revival architecture in New Jersey
Hotel buildings completed in 1929
Hotels established in 1929
Skyscraper hotels in Atlantic City, New Jersey
National Register of Historic Places in Atlantic County, New Jersey
New Jersey Register of Historic Places
1929 establishments in New Jersey
Georgian Revival architecture in New Jersey